Ochlerus is a genus of true bugs belonging to the family Pentatomidae.

The species of this genus are found in Central America.

Species:

Ochlerus breddini 
Ochlerus cinctus 
Ochlerus coriaceus 
Ochlerus lutosus 
Ochlerus rusticus 
Ochlerus sordidus 
Ochlerus tenuicornis

References

Pentatomidae